The 10th Armored Division (nicknamed "Tiger Division") was an armored division of the United States Army in World War II. In the European Theater of Operations the 10th Armored Division was part of both the Twelfth United States Army Group and Sixth United States Army Group. Originally assigned to the Third United States Army under General George S. Patton, it saw action with the Seventh United States Army under General Alexander Patch near the conclusion of the war.

The 10th Armored Division was inactivated on 13 October 1945 at Camp Patrick Henry, Virginia.  On 25 February 1953, the division was allotted to the Regular Army but remained inactive.

History

The division was activated on 15 July 1942, at Fort Benning, Georgia, around a nucleus of the reorganized and redesignated 3rd and 11th Cavalry Regiments.

Nickname
The "Tiger" nickname of the 10th originates from a division-wide contest held while it was training in the United States, symbolizing the division "clawing and mauling" its way through the enemy. Major General Paul Newgarden, the division's first commander selected "Tiger" as the winner because a tiger has soldierly qualities, including being clean and neat and the ability to maneuver and surprise his prey.

Combat chronicle
The 10th Armored Division entered France through the port of Cherbourg-en-Cotentin, 23 September 1944, and put in a month of training at Teurtheville, France, before entering combat, as part of the Third Army under General George S. Patton. Leaving Teurtheville, 25 October, the Division moved to Mars-la-Tour, where it entered combat, 2 November, in support of the XX Corps, containing enemy troops in the area. Later that month, the 10th participated in the capture of Metz. After fierce fighting, the 10th moved to the Siegfried Line and led the Third Army into Germany on 19 November 1944.

Bastogne

Combat Command-B's lead Sherman tanks, tank destroyers and half-tracks entered Bastogne 18 December 1944. These were the first combat troops to reach the threatened town. CCB's commander, Col. William L. Roberts, split his command to form a crescent-shaped arc facing eastward five miles from the city. A task force commanded by Maj. William R. Desobry went north to Noville, while a similar group under Lt. Col. Henry T. Cherry wheeled east to Longvilly. Lt. Col. James O'Hara's group shifted southeast to Bras.

At the same time, German forces moved westward with increasing momentum. Bastogne, a hub from which seven main roads diverged, was essential to the swift movement of Rundstedt's panzers. Before dawn of 19 December five German divisions attacked CCB.  Bazooka-armed American soldiers and a single platoon of tank destroyers fought a column of German Panzer IV tanks on the Houffalize-Noville highway, turning them back. More enemy armor followed and with the road blocked, the battle spilled into the snow-covered fields and woods. For eight hours, CCB alone withstood multiple German attacks before reinforcements arrived from the 101st Airborne Division, which had moved into Bastogne under the screen of the 10th's actions.

The Germans still maintained an advantage and the outnumbered Americans withdrew closer to Bastogne. The Germans sent pincers to the north and south. The night of 21 December, the pincers met and closed west of the city. In the surrounded city, the 10th assembled a mobile reserve force to strike in any direction.

CCB endured the cold, artillery barrages and bombing while their supplies and ammunition dwindled.  Fourth Armored Division tanks finally broke through on 26 December, but CCB continued to fight until 18 January.

After the battle, the 10th Armored Division's 21st Tank Battalion and Combat Command B were awarded the Presidential Unit Citation for their actions from 17 to 27 December 1944 Battle of the Bulge. The 101 Airborne Division was also honored with the Presidential Unit Citation for their actions at Bastogne. Years after the war, General Anthony McAuliffe said "In my opinion, Combat Command B of the 10th Armored Division was never properly credited with their important role in the Bastogne battle."

Across the Saar
In early February 1945, the 10th reassembled at Metz and was able to rest briefly after rejoining the XX Corps. On 20 February 1945, the 10th again attacked the German defenses. In one day, they broke the German lines, and after 48 hours, the division advanced 85 miles, overran the Saar-Moselle Triangle, and reached the Saar River. The 10th then crossed the Saar and captured Trier and a bridge across the Moselle River. The loss of this heavily defended city caused German defenses to collapse. Generals Dwight Eisenhower and Patton visited the 10th Armored Division to congratulate them.

The division raced through Kaiserslautern, crossed the Rhine River on 28 March 1945, and continued east. The division helped to seize Heilbronn, defended the Crailsheim Salient, and moved south to isolate Stuttgart. As part of the VI Corps the 10th crossed the Danube River on 23 April 1945. By 27 April 1945 it was one of several Seventh Army corps headed towards the Alps to seal off passes out of Germany, reaching Innsbruck, Austria by early May. By 9 May 1945, elements of the 10th had reached Mittenwald, Bavaria, where they halted. The 10th occupied southern Bavaria until September 1945. On 3 October 1945, the division sailed from Marseilles, France. It arrived at Newport News, Virginia on 13 October 1945 and was inactivated at Camp Patrick Henry, Virginia on the same day. The 10th Armored Division had captured 650 towns and cities along with 56,000 German prisoners. 

In one week, the 10th advanced 100 miles and captured 8,000 prisoners from 26 different enemy divisions. After a four-day respite, the 10th was one of several divisions spearheading the Seventh Army drive under General Alexander Patch into Bavaria. With rapid night movements, the "Tigers" continually surprised the Germans. German dispatches referred to the 10th as the "Ghost Division."  As it drove into Bavaria, the division overran one of the many subcamps of Dachau concentration camp in the Landsberg area on 27 April 1945, earning it recognition as a liberating unit.

Composition 
The division was composed of the following units:

 Headquarters
 Headquarters Company
 Combat Command A
 Combat Command B
 Combat Command Reserve
 3rd Tank Battalion
 11th Tank Battalion
 21st Tank Battalion
 20th Armored Infantry Battalion
 54th Armored Infantry Battalion
 61st Armored Infantry Battalion
 Headquarters and Headquarters Battery, 10th Armored Division Artillery
 419th Armored Field Artillery Battalion
 420th Armored Field Artillery Battalion
 423rd Armored Field Artillery Battalion
 90th Cavalry Reconnaissance Squadron (Mechanized)
 55th Armored Engineer Battalion
 150th Armored Signal Company
 Headquarters and Headquarters Company, 10th Armored Division Trains
 132nd Ordnance Maintenance Battalion
 80th Armored Medical Battalion
 Military Police Platoon
 Band

Assignments
The 10th Armored Division served under the following commands in the ETO:

 5 September 1944: III Corps, Ninth Army, 12th Army Group. 
 10 October 1944: Third Army, 12th Army Group.
 23 October 1944: XX Corps. 
 7 December 1944: Third Army, 12th Army Group, but attached to VIII Corps, First Army, 12th Army Group.
 16 December 1944: XX Corps, Third Army, 12th Army Group, but attached to First Army, 12th Army Group.
 20 December 1944: III Corps, Third Army, 12th Army Group.
 21 December 1944: XII Corps.
 26 December 1944: XX Corps.
 17 January 1945: Third Army, 12th Army Group, but attached to the XXI Corps, Seventh Army, 6th Army Group.
 25 January 1945: XV Corps.
 10 February 1945: XX Corps, Third Army, 12th Army Group.
 23 March 1945: Third Army, 12th Army Group, but attached to the XXI Corps, Seventh Army, 6th Army Group.
 1 April 1945: VI Corps, Seventh Army, 6th Army Group.
 8 April 1945: VI Corps.

Casualties

Total battle casualties: 4,031
Killed in action: 642
Wounded in action: 3,109
Missing in action: 64
Prisoner of war: 216

In film
In the 2001 HBO show, Band of Brothers, a 10th Armored Division officer, George C. Rice, played by comedian/actor Jimmy Fallon, is depicted handing out ammunition and supplies to paratroopers of Easy Company, part of the 2nd Battalion, 506th Parachute Infantry Regiment of the 101st Airborne Division during the Battle of the Bulge.

The 10th Armored Division is also represented in the epic 1970 Academy Award-winning film Patton. General George Patton was played by George C. Scott.

See also 
Kenneth Althaus
SS Sea Owl – 55th AEB

Notes

References
 

 
 
 

 Patton's Unsung Armor of the Ardennes-The Tenth Armored Division's Secret Dash to Bastogne, Patterson, Eugene

External links

 10th Armored.com home page
 The Tigers of Bastogne
 10th Armored at 419th.com
 Old Tiger Cub.com
 history.army.mil 10th Armored at history.army.mil) 
  10th Armored at Lone Sentry.com
 10th Armored at Center of Military History

10th Armored Division, United States
Armored Division, U.S. 10th
Military units and formations established in 1942
1945 disestablishments in Georgia (U.S. state)
1942 establishments in Georgia (U.S. state)
Military units and formations disestablished in 1945